Stronger Than Heaven is the third album by the German heavy metal band Stormwitch, released in 1986. The album is the third album to have tracks from it used in the compilation Priest of Evil of 1998. The track "Ravenlord" was covered by HammerFall as a bonus track on their debut album Glory to the Brave. An alternate acoustic version of the song "Rats in the Attic" was recorded at Talk Heavy Radio / Münster and can be heard on the band's website.

Track listing
All songs written by Lee Tarot, except for where noted.

Side one
 "Intro" - 0:31
 "Rats in the Attic" - 3:06
 "Eternia" (Tarot, Steve Merchant) - 3:59
 "Jonathan's Diary" - 7:23
 "Slave to Moonlight" - 4:03

Side two
"Stronger Than Heaven" - 4:38
 "Ravenlord" - 3:41
 "Allies of the Dark" - 4:18
 "Dorian Gray" - 5:39

Reissued on CD in 2004 by Battlecry Records (formerly Iron Glory Records) with these bonus tracks:
"Children of the Night"
 "Buried Alive"
 "Long Boats on the Horizon"
 "Beware the Demons"

Personnel
Stormwitch
 Andy Mück alias Andy Aldrian – vocals
 Lee Tarot – guitars
 Steve Merchant – guitars
 Ronny Pearson – bass
 Pete Lancer – drums

Production
Tom Krüger - engineer, mixing
Batze Kramer - engineer

References

1986 albums
Stormwitch albums